Richard Pearce (born January 25, 1943) is an American film director, television director and cinematographer. In addition to feature films, he has directed made-for-TV movies and TV series.

Early life and education
Born in 1943 in San Diego, California, Richard Pearce went east to high school, attending St. Paul's School in Concord, New Hampshire.

He attended Yale University, where he earned a B.A., English in 1965 where he met D.A. Pennebaker; afterwards he moved to New York City working with Pennebaker and Richard Leacock on several documentaries.

Accolades
In 1980 he won the Golden Bear award at the 30th Berlin International Film Festival for his film Heartland.

Filmography

As director 
 1977: The Gardener's Son (TV)
 1978: Siege (TV)
 1979: No Other Love (TV)
 1979: Heartland
 1981: Threshold
 1983: Sessions (TV)
 1984: Country
 1985: Alfred Hitchcock Presents (TV series)
 1986: No Mercy
 1989: Dead Man Out (TV)
 1989: The Final Days (TV)
 1990: The Long Walk Home (movie)
 1992: Leap of Faith
 1993: Homicide: Life on the Street (TV series)
 1994: Party of Five (TV series)
 1996: A Family Thing
 1997: Nothing Sacred (TV series)
 1998: Thicker Than Blood (TV)
 1999: Witness Protection (TV)
 2001: South Pacific (TV)
 2002: CSI: Miami (TV series)
 2003: The Blues: The Road to Memphis (TV series) 
 2004: Plainsong (TV)
 2005: Law & Order: Trial by Jury (TV series)
 2006: Fatal Contact: Bird Flu in America (TV)

As cinematographer
Dont Look Back (1967)
Woodstock (1970)
Interviews with My Lai Veterans (1970)
Marjoe (1972)
Hearts and Minds (1974) 
Hair (1979) (additional photographer) 
Food, Inc. (2008)

References

External links 
 
 Viewer's Guide to the ABC-TV Movie: Fatal Contact: Bird Flu in America, U.S. Department of Health and Human Services
Montana Film Festival profile

1943 births
Living people
American cinematographers
American television directors
Yale University alumni
Directors of Golden Bear winners